Lithophane subtilis is a species of cutworm or dart moth in the family Noctuidae. It is found in North America.

The MONA or Hodges number for Lithophane subtilis is 9900.

References

Further reading

 
 
 

subtilis
Articles created by Qbugbot
Moths described in 1969